Andrés Sabella Gálvez International Airport  is an airport serving Antofagasta, capital of the Antofagasta Region of Chile.

The Antofagasta VOR-DME (Ident: FAG) and non-directional beacon (Ident: R) are located on the approach path to Runway 01.

Airlines and destinations

See also

Transport in Chile
List of airports in Chile

References

External links 
Andrés Sabella Gálvez Airport at OpenStreetMap

Cerro Moreno Airport at FallingRain
 Airport record for Aeropuerto Cerro Moreno at Landings.com

Buildings and structures in Antofagasta
Airports in Antofagasta Region